Lieutenant general Fons Aler ( 3 May 1896 – 21 December 1981) was a Dutch military officer who served as Chairman of the United Defence Staff of the Armed Forces of the Netherlands between  January 1953 and October 1953. In 1997 a Fokker 50 of the Royal Netherlands Air Force was named after Aler.

References

External links 
 

1896 births
1981 deaths
Royal Netherlands Air Force generals
Royal Netherlands Air Force officers
Chiefs of the Defence Staff (Netherlands)